A cubic yard (symbol yd3) is an Imperial / U.S. customary (non-SI non-metric) unit of volume, used in Canada and the United States. It is defined as the volume of a cube with sides of 1 yard (3 feet, 36 inches, 0.9144 meters) in length.

Symbols and abbreviations
The IEEE symbol for the cubic yard is yd3. The following abbreviations are used:
cubic yards, cubic yard, cubic yds, cubic yd
cu yards, cu yard, cu yds, cu yd, CYs
yards/-3, yard/-3, yds/-3, yd/-3
yards^3, yard^3, yds^3, yd^3
yards3, yard3, yds3

Cubic yard per second
One cubic yard per second (1 yd3/s) is a unit of volume flow rate. It corresponds to one cubic yard passing through a specified area every second.

Cubic yard per minute
One cubic yard per minute (1 yd3/min) is a unit of volume flow rate. It corresponds to one cubic yard passing through a specified area every minute.
 1 yd3/s = 60 yd3/min

Conversions

See also
 cubic foot
 cubic inch
 Square yard
 Orders of magnitude (volume)
 Conversion of units
 Cube (arithmetic), cube root
 Cubic equation, cubic function

References

Units of volume
Imperial units
Customary units of measurement in the United States

ja:ヤード#立方ヤード